The 1983 Giro del Trentino was the seventh edition of the Tour of the Alps cycle race and was held on 2 May to 5 May 1983. The race started in Folgaria and finished in Trento. The race was won by Francesco Moser.

General classification

References

1983
1983 in road cycling
1983 in Italian sport
May 1983 sports events in Europe